Kubir Sarkar also known as Kubir Goshai (Bengali: Falgun 1194 and 11 Ashar 1286) (1787–1879) was a prominent Bengali philosopher, author, Baul saint, mystic, songwriter, social reformer and thinker in Bengal of British India. He was popular as a poet and kaviyal ;and alongside he was also known as a famous theorist of Bengal's
Secularism. He was a lyricist and composer of songs from the Sahebdhani minor religious sect of Bengal. Some of his notable songs include 
Dub dub dub rupshagore amar mon/ Tolatol patal khujle pabi re prem rotnodhon.

Early life 
Kubir Sarkar was born in 1787 into a weaver family in the village of
Madhupur in the district of Nadia, West Bengal. He became a disciple of Guru Charan Pal of the village
Brittihuda, in Nadia and that is where he met his demise. Then he became Kubir Goshai.

Personal life 
He had numbers of the leading students. Among of them, Jadubindu() is an important disciple of Kubir Goshai.  He was also a famous lyricist and composer of songs from the Sahebdhani minor religious sect of Bengal. Kubir Goshai died in Nadia in 1879(Bengali:  11 Ashar 1286).

Works and legacy 
Kubir Goshai’s philosophy was mainly based on the Vaisnava Sahajiya .According to Sahajiya philosophy, along with an external form; every object also has an internal form. On his birth anniversary, his followers and students have preserved his diary full of songs beside his tomb. Kubir Goshai composed over 1,203 songs.

Most popular songs

External links

See also 
 Music of Bengal

References 

Bengali musicians
Bengali male poets
Bhakti movement
Bengali philosophers
1787 births
1879 deaths
Musicians from West Bengal